Philippine Science High School - Soccsksargen Region Campus (PSHS-SRC), situated at Brgy. Paraiso, Koronadal City, is the 12th campus of the Philippine Science High School System which admits and grants scholarships to students who are gifted in science and mathematics all over Soccsksargen and neighboring places. Admission to this campus is by passing the National Competitive Examination organized and conducted by the PSHS System annually and only Filipino citizens are qualified to attend. Soccsksargen covers the provinces of South Cotabato, North Cotabato, Sarangani and Sultan Kudarat. The PSHS-SRC formally opened on June 17, 2013 with 52 scholars comprising as the pioneering batch.

History

Philippine Science High School System History
The first Philippine Science High School was established in Diliman, Quezon City under Republic Act No. 3661, known as the PSHS Charter. The school opened on 5 September 1964 at a rented building owned by the Philippine Government Employees Association along Elliptical Road, Diliman, Quezon City. It was only in 1970 that the school moved to its present campus along Agham Road, Diliman, Quezon City.  In 1997, the PSHS System Law (R.A. 8496) was signed by President Fidel V. Ramos. It established the PSHS System and unified all the existing campuses into a single system of governance and management. In 2001, the PSHS System Law was further amended by R.A. No. 9036 consolidating the power and authority over all PSHS System campuses into a single Board of Trustees to ensure uniform policy coordination, standards and management.

Soccsksargen Region Campus
PSHS-SRC was founded on February 3, 2012 by virtue of BOT Resolution No. 2012-02-04 to ensure optimum distribution of opportunities for Science & Technology-gifted in Region XII and neighboring areas. The campus formally opened on June 17, 2013 with a pioneering batch consisting 52 Filipino scholars. Since 2013 to present, SRC has been under the tutelage of Dr. Chuchi P. Garganera, Campus Director.

Admission
Grade 6 students who belong to the top 10% of the class or must have special aptitude in Science & Mathematics must take and perform well in the NCE, the admission test of the Philippine Science High School System, also indicating their interest in the Soccsksargen Region Campus.

National Competitive Examination
Admission to the PSHS System is through the PSHS System National Competitive Examination (PSHS-NCE). The screening consists of tests in Verbal, Abstract Reasoning, Science and Mathematics. To be eligible for admission, applicants must be Filipino students who must belong to the top 10% of the graduating class or must have special aptitude in science and math. The top 90 scholars from the region are admitted as scholars.

Lateral Admissions Qualifying Examination

A student who has finished Grade 7 / Grade 8 (under the high school curriculum or the new K-12 curriculum) outside of the PSHS System may be allowed admission/entry to the PSHS by passing the Lateral Admissions Qualifying Examination. It annually occurs during summer before the new Academic School year starts.

Administration

Board of Trustees
The Board of Trustees is the highest policy-making body of the PSHS System. It coordinates with the Executive Committee for the implementation of these policies. It is composed of eight ex officio members and five private sector representatives, chaired by the DOST secretary.

Office of the Executive Director
The Office of the Executive Director is the personal office of the head of the direct service administration and chief planner of the system. The OED recommends policies and guidelines for the consideration of the Board of Trustees. The Executive Director spearheads the Executive Committee, which is composed of the different directors belonging to different campuses. The Executive Council is the collegial body – composed of the Executive Director, the Deputy Executive Director, the Main Campus Director, and the Regional Campus Directors.

Office of the Campus Director

Curriculum & Instruction Services Division

Finance & Administrative Division
The Finance and Administration Division is responsible for providing financial and administrative support to the whole school system. Among these include budgeting and accounting, as well as procurement and contracting of goods and services.

Student Services Division
The Student Services Division handles the different branches of the school in charge of rendering suitable services and benefits, as well as providing for its students and their welfare.

Education

Special Curriculum
The PSHS-SRC follows the same special curriculum prescribed and designated by the Philippine Science High School System. The core curriculum is packed with Science, Mathematics, and Technology courses.

The names of each section in each grade level correspond to a theme based on the major subject offered in that particular grade level. (Earth Science for Grade 7, Biology for Grade 8, Chemistry for Grade 9, and Physics for Grade 10)

Grade 7 (Gemstones)
 Diamond
 Sapphire
 Ruby
 Emerald

Grade 8 (Trees)
Acacia
Mahogany
Narra

Grade 9 (Chemical Elements)
Lithium
Potassium
Sodium

Grade 10 (Subatomic Particles)
Electron
Proton
Neutron

Academic Grading System
Grades are reported in terms of the stanine. 1.00 is the highest grade while 5.00 is a failing mark. 2.50 is the passing grade and any grade lower than this is termed substandard. The student's current standing for a subject is calculated by adding 1/3 of the previous quarter's grade and 2/3 of the tentative grade of the quarter. The general weighted average (GWA) of the student should be 2.25 or better to be in good standing.

Stanine

Note: The percentage range is used in actual computations of grades while the equivalent range is used in translating the grades for use outside of the system (e.g. application to colleges/universities).

Director's List
Every quarter, students who garner a general weighted average (GWA) of 1.50 or better are included in an honor roll known as the Director's List.

Student life

The Student Alliance
The Student Alliance (SA) is the highest governing body of the entire studentry.

Pisay's Researchers in Science and Mathematics (PRISM)
The Pisay’s Researchers in Science and Mathematics is the premier science institution of the Philippine Science High School - Soccsksargen Region Campus. It was first established by the PSHS-SRC pioneering batch of 2019 to help support and facilitate scholars’ activities related to Science, Technology, Engineering and Mathematics, which also helps PSHS-SRC in promoting STEM inside and outside the campus.

PRISM is headed by scholars elected from the student body to primarily organize the said activities. Any scholar who meets the eligibility requirements stipulated in the PRISM Constitution-and-by-Laws are automatically nominated to take an officership position under PRISM.

Alternative Learning Activities (ALA)

 Student Peer Facilitators
 S.U.D.O
 Chess Club
 Sports Club
 PSHS-SRC Chorale/Music Club
 Young Inventors' Club
 Creative Writing
 Debate Club
 Art Club
 Peli-Kasan (Pelikula-Kalikasan)
 BookSan (Books at Kalikasan)
 Math Club
 Public Speakering Guild
 IClick - Photography and Poetry
 Theater Club

The Tunog System
In order to develop the bond and unity among scholars, the PSHS-SRC implemented the 'Tunog' System which is set to anchor any school activity this school year 2014-2015. The implementation of this system aims for six (6) aspects: Academic mentoring; Peer counseling to provide emotional support; Monitoring of overall student performances; Sports events for leisure and physical fitness; Musical, theatrical and cultural events and promotion; and, Maintenance of cleanliness and orderliness.

The system consists of six tunog which includes:
 Debakandabest
 Agong
 Kudyapi
 Gangza
 Kulintang
 KubingEach tunog is composed of members from the students, faculty, and staff led by the Datu, Waiír and Raja Tagasulat. The names were derived from the balangay system of the first settlers in the Philippines to reflect patriotism in the Filipinos' cultural ways and to live out the core values of the Philippine Science High School System. "The main purposes of the tunog system are to enhance the social interaction between the teachers and the students of different grade levels and to help every student in each tunog with their academic studies. I hope that it will fully prosper for years and will effectively serve its purpose," said Jhona Cresila Quezada, the schools' Student Services Division chief.

Since School Year 2016-2017, the Tunog System is no longer being used. The penultimate of the capabilities of the scholars are limitless.

School Publications

The school annually produces two publications that allows the scholars the optimum opportunity to express their thoughts and opinions freely. THE TWELFTH QUILL is the PSHS-SRC's official publication in English. PISAY PLUMA, on the other hand, is the official publication in Filipino. Both publications provide a good training ground for scholars in the field of journalism as reporting, layout, design, editing, and final production are done by the students under the supervision of a faculty adviser.

Science and Humanities & Sports Festival

The school annually holds its own version of intramural named Science and Humanities & Sports Festival'''. The said event is an event where all students get to finally showcase their talents, skills, and abilities. The reigning champion of the event is Batch 2020, the present Grade 10.

Student Services and Facilities
As true to its mission and vision, the campus is also equipped with certain facilities to provide its scholars the welfare and development they need when they are in school.

Residence Halls
There are two dormitories in the vicinity of the campus, namely Girls’ Residence Hall and Boys' Residence Hall. These dormitories offer accommodations for the nation’s scholars from all over Soccsksargen and some neighboring areas.

Library

Library is in construction with a temporary library available for scholars

Guidance Center

Clinic
PSHS-SRC has its own clinic where students can go  if they have injuries, medical concerns, or if they need medicine. Student's health records are also kept in the clinic. The "pisay" smc clinic also has a nurse to help students when they need assistance.

References

Philippine Science High School System
Schools in South Cotabato
Education in Koronadal